Cambridge, New Jersey may refer to:

Cambridge, Delran, New Jersey
Cambridge, Evesham, New Jersey